The 1993 Grand Prix Passing Shot, also known as the Bordeaux Open, was a men's tennis tournament played on outdoor hardcourts at Villa Primrose in Bordeaux, France that was part of the World Series of the 1993 ATP Tour. It was the 16th edition of the tournament and was held from 13 September until 19 September 1993. First-seeded Sergi Bruguera won the singles title.

Finals

Singles

 Sergi Bruguera defeated  Diego Nargiso 7–5, 6–2
 It was Bruguera's 5th singles title of the year and 11th of his career.

Doubles

 Pablo Albano /  Javier Frana defeated  David Adams /  Andrei Olhovskiy 7–6, 4–6, 6–3

References

External links
 ITF tournament edition details

Grand Prix Passing Shot
ATP Bordeaux
Grand Prix Passing Shot
Grand Prix Passing Shot